The 2022 NWSL Draft was the 10th annual meeting of National Women's Soccer League (NWSL) franchises to select eligible college players. It was held on December 18, 2021, and hosted remotely by CBS Sports.

Format 
 All 12 teams of the National Women's Soccer League (NWSL) take turns making their selections over four rounds, with 12 picks per round plus any additional compensatory picks. Draft order in each round was determined by the reverse order of the final 2021 regular season standings, with the exceptions being Angel City FC and San Diego Wave FC taking the first two selections as expansion teams and the two teams that contested the 2021 Championship game, Washington Spirit and Chicago Red Stars, taking the last two selections.
 After winning a coin flip, San Diego Wave FC selected priority in the NWSL Draft. As a result, San Diego received pick No. 1 in both the first and third rounds of the draft, while Angel City will select first in rounds two and four. By virtue, Angel City were given the first pick in the 2022 NWSL Expansion Draft.
 Each expansion team received a compensatory pick at the conclusion of the second round of the NWSL Draft. A coin flip determined that San Diego Wave FC would select the first compensatory pick at No. 25, and Angel City FC would make the second pick at No. 26.
 The 2022 NWSL Draft was open to any high school or college athlete who was enrolled at a university in the United States during the 2021–22 academic year; had exhausted, lost, or renounced their remaining collegiate eligibility during the 2021 calendar year; would be at least 18-years old by the conclusion of the 2022 NWSL League Season; not be under a current professional contract, nor have previously signed a contract to play soccer professionally; and registered for the NWSL Draft by the registration deadline.
 On December 3, 2021, it was announced that the board of governors had voted to increase the number of draft-eligible players ahead of the 2022 NWSL Draft. Registration was not required for the 2021 NWSL Draft due to the pandemic-altered NCAA soccer schedule. Those players who were draft-eligible, but went undrafted in the 2021 NWSL Draft, were therefore NWSL discovery-eligible in 2021, even if they retained NCAA eligibility. The updated rules for the 2022 NWSL Draft allowed players who were otherwise eligible, but currently on a NWSL team's discovery list, the choice to either remain on that team's discovery list or be removed in order to register for 2022 NWSL Draft.
 On December 14, 2021, the NWSL announced the list of players registered for the draft.
 CBS Sports covered the draft on various platforms, including CBS Sports Network, Paramount+ and CBS Sports HQ. Internationally, the draft was available to stream live on Twitch.

Results

Key

Picks

Notable undrafted players
Below is a list of undrafted rookies who appeared in a competitive NWSL game in 2022.

Trades
Round 1:

Round 2:

Round 3:

Round 4:

Compensatory picks:

Summary
In 2022, a total of 40 colleges had players selected. Of these, five had a player drafted to the NWSL for the first time: Gonzaga, Grand Canyon, Long Beach State, Michigan State and Purdue.

Schools with multiple draft selections

Selections by college athletic conference

Selections by position

See also
 List of drafts held by the NWSL
 List of National Women's Soccer League draftees by college team
 2022 National Women's Soccer League season

References

External links
 

National Women's Soccer League drafts
2022 National Women's Soccer League season
NWSL Draft